Renato Reis de Andrade (born 1 July 1994 in Espargo, Santa Maria da Feira), known as Rena, is a Portuguese professional footballer who plays as a midfielder for Florgrade FC.

References

External links

Portuguese League profile 

Rena at ZeroZero

1994 births
Living people
Portuguese footballers
Association football midfielders
Liga Portugal 2 players
Segunda Divisão players
C.D. Feirense players
Lusitânia F.C. players
Sportspeople from Santa Maria da Feira